Supreme National Defense University, acronymed DĀʿĀ, is an Iranian University located in Tehran. Subordinate of General Staff of Armed Forces of the Islamic Republic of Iran, the university is dedicated to doctoral-level work on military doctrine, applied defense sciences and management.

References

External links 
Website

Universities in Tehran
Military education and training in Iran